Real World/Road Rules Challenge: The Inferno is the 8th season of the MTV reality game show, The Challenge (at the time known as Real World/Road Rules Challenge).
The season is directly subsequent to The Gauntlet.

The Inferno aired in 2004. The season was composed of twenty cast members, and took place in Acapulco, Mexico. In this challenge, the winning teams would receive a prize at the end of each mission. They would then nominate two players from their team to the Inferno elimination challenge. Unlike The Gauntlet, there would be another challenge with an immunity life-saver up for grabs before the Inferno. Each team then selected one of the two nominees from the opposing team to go into the Inferno.

This is the first edition of The Inferno series, with The Inferno II and The Inferno 3 following in 2005 and 2007, respectively.

Contestants

Gameplay

Inferno games
Bug Helmet:The contestants put their heads into glass boxes filled with hundreds of cockroaches with syrup covering their face. The player who stays in their box the longest wins.
Played By: Ace vs. Jeremy
Chili Counter:The player who eats the most chilis in a one-hour sitting wins.
Played By: Holly vs. Trishelle
Human Candelabra:The two players have a candle in each hand while holding their arm's out straight, the player who holds that position the longest wins.
Played By: Jeremy vs. Mike
Noise Pollution: Each player must wear a set of headphones while standing on a two-foot high platform for two hours. If there is a tie, then the players must stand on a four-inch block with one leg, the last person standing wins.
Played By: Christena vs. Mallory
Don't Toss Your Cookies: The players must eat cookies and drink milk, then get onto a spinning platform for 10 minutes, they continue this until one of the players vomits. The player who does not vomit wins the Inferno.
Played By: CT vs. ShaneScratchathon: Each player is covered in itching powder and must walk on a treadmill for three hours, whoever outlasts their opponent wins. In the event of a tie, each contestant must jump rope, whoever jump ropes the longest wins the Inferno.
Played By: Julie vs. KatieBrick by Brick: The players must transfer their bricks one at a time from one pile to the next, while walking across a plank. Players are disqualified if they drop a brick, break one, or fall off the plank. Whoever has transferred the most bricks at the end of three and a half hours wins.
Played By: Kendal vs LeahSmell You Later: The contestants are each placed into their own plexiglass coffins, after every half hour for the first hour and a half, another layer of bad smelling substances are added to the coffins. At the end of four hours, if both players are still in their coffins, each player must hold their breath in the water, whoever holds it the longest wins the Inferno.
Played By: David vs. KatieGame summary

 Real World won the challenge
 Road Rules won the challenge
 The contestant won the Life Saver and saved themselves
 The contestant was placed in the Inferno by the Life Saver winner
 The contestant was saved by another contestant with a Life Saver
 The contestant won the Life Saver and put themselves in the Inferno

Inferno progress

Teams
 The contestant is on the Real World team
 The contestant is on the Road Rules team
Competition
 The contestant won the final challenge
 The contestant lost the final challenge
 The contestant won the Aztec Life Saver and saved themselves
 The contestant won the Aztec Life Saver but chose not to use it
 The contestant was safe from the Inferno
 The contestant was selected to go into the Inferno
 The contestant was nominated but not selected to go into the Inferno
 The contestant was saved by the Aztec Life Saver winner
 The contestant was selected to go into the Inferno and won
 The contestant was put into the Inferno by the Aztec Life Saver winner and won
 The contestant won the Aztec Life Saver, went into the Inferno and won
 The contestant was put into the Inferno and lost
 The contestant was put into the Inferno by the Aztec Life Saver winner and lost

Episodes

Reunion special
The reunion special, Montezuma's Revenge: Inside the Inferno'', was aired on May 31, 2004, featuring the finalists and was hosted by VJ La La Vazquez.

External links

 MTV's official Real World website
 MTV's official Road Rules website

References

Inferno
2004 American television seasons
Television shows set in Acapulco
Television shows filmed in Mexico